Shankharapur is a municipality in Kathmandu District in Bagmati Province of Nepal that was established on 2 December 2014 by merging the former Village development committees Bajrayogini, Karkigaun, Bhulbu, Indrayani, Lapsiphedi, Naglebhare, Pukhulachhi and Suntol. The office of the municipality is that of the former Pukhulachhi village development committee in the old Newari town of Sankhu. 

In the Local Level Election 2079, Ramesh Napit of Rastriya Prajatantra Party was elected as mayor securing 3,731 votes and Samita Shrestha of Nepali Congress was elected as Deputy Mayor securing 5,658 votes.

Population
Shankharapur municipality has a total population of 25,338 according to 2011 Nepal census.

References

External links
Shankharapur

Populated places in Kathmandu District